Pisau Cukur  (Malay: "Razor Knife", but also metaphorically "Gold Digger") is a 2009 Malaysian Malay-language mystery comedy film directed by Bernard Chauly, which is his first comedy after his 2005 blockbuster break-out drama Gol & Gincu. It stars popular Malaysian actresses Nur Fazura and Maya Karin, and also Singaporean actor Aaron Aziz.

Plot
The movie is about two best friends Bella (Maya Karin) and Intan (Nur Fazura) who goes on vacation on a cruise ship. During the vacation, Bella searches for a rich husband which eventually leads her to Datuk Hisham (Eizlan Yusof), while Intan becomes involved with Ari (Aaron Aziz) in a murder case of the well known Datuk Zakaria Hitam (Rahim Razali).

Development 
A collaboration by Red Films and Primeworks Studios, the movie is written by Rafidah Abdullah (host of TV3's teen-oriented current affairs programme 3R and writer for Gol & Gincu). She has contributed towards a movie that is bound to create controversy among certain quarters. However, as the director has told the press, "People should watch and value the movie themselves because a quality movie will go beyond the superficial elements and entertain nevertheless."

Cast
 Nur Fazura as Intan Mastura 
 Maya Karin as Bella 
 Aaron Aziz as Bahari Amri Ridzuan a.k.a. Ari 
 Eizlan Yusof as Datuk Hisham Tan Sri Kamaruddin 
 Redza Minhat as Faqir 
 Rahim Razali as Datuk Zakaria Hitam 
 Khatijah Tan as Datin Wahidah 
 Umie Aida as Naini 
 Sharifah Sofia as Sal 
 Liyana Jasmay as Suri 
 Nas-T as Johan 
 Radhi Khalid as Dato Salleh
 Yasmin Yusoff as Hani
 Henry Golding as Iskandar Tan Sri Murad 
 Nabila Huda as Natasha 
 Othman Hafsham as Tengku Hamash Tengku Jamaluddin
 Lew Ngai Yuen as Wanita Baran
 Elaine Pedley as Jurulatih Tari
Several notable artists made cameos in this movie, such as Afdlin Shauki as the captain of the cruise ship. Comedian Nabil Ahmad plays the owner of Restaurant Marina; the cruise ship's yoga teacher; and host for the ship's in-house entertainment programme "Siapa Nak Kahwin Jutawan" (Malay: "Who Wants to Marry a Millionaire"), with Norman Abdul Halim of KRU playing the millionaire in question, Imran. The film's script writer Rafidah Abdullah cameos as the receptionist at Camar Spa while her colleague in "3R", Kartini Arrifin plays a newsreader. Bernice Chauly appears briefly as a teacher.

References

External links
 
 
 

2009 films
Malay-language films
English-language Malaysian films
Malaysian comedy-drama films
Grand Brilliance films